The 1882 Richmond Colts football team was an American football team that represented Richmond College—now known as the University of Richmond—as an independent during the 1882 college football season.

Schedule

References

Richmond
Richmond Spiders football seasons
College football undefeated seasons
Richmond Colts football